The 2013 Summer Tour was the third concert tour by American pop/R&B singer Toni Braxton. The tour kicked off in Las Vegas on August 9, 2013 and ended in Atlanta on August 31, 2013. Toni's sisters, Trina and Towanda Braxton, were featured on the tour as background singers.

Setlist
"I Heart You"
"How Many Ways"
"Seven Whole Days"
"You Mean the World to Me"
"Another Sad Love Song"
"Love Shoulda Brought You Home"
"How Could an Angel Break My Heart"
"Yesterday"
"Just Be a Man About It"
"I Love Me Some Him"
"There's No Me Without You" / "Trippin' (That's the Way Love Works)" / "I Don't Want To"
"Spanish Guitar"
"Let It Flow"
"Breathe Again"
"Party or Go Home" (performed by Trina Braxton)
"Please" / "Take This Ring" / "Hit the Freeway"
"He Wasn't Man Enough"
Encore

Band
Musical Director/Piano: Davy Nathan
Keyboards: Kevin Randolph
Guitar: Roy Kariok 
Bass: Dammo Farmer 
Drums: Donald Barrett
Background vocalists: Trina Braxton, Towanda Braxton

Shows 

Festivals and other miscellaneous performances
31st annual Martin Luther King Jr. Concert Series

Cancellations and rescheduled shows

Box office score data

References 

Toni Braxton concert tours
2013 concert tours